Paul Ratcliffe is an English-born American college soccer coach. He is the head coach of Stanford Cardinal women's soccer. He led Stanford to the 2011 National Championship. He is a three-time NSCAA Coach of the Year, winning the award in 2008, 2009, and 2011.

Coaching career
Ratcliffe was the head coach of Saint Mary's from 1998 until February 2003, when he was hired to coach Stanford. He won NSCAA Coach of the Year in 2008, 2009, and 2011. He led Stanford to national runners-up finishes in 2009 and 2010 before leading Stanford to a 2011, 2017, and 2019 National Championships.

College head coaching record

See also
 List of college women's soccer coaches with 300 wins

References

External links
Stanford bio

American soccer players
English footballers
American women's soccer coaches
People from Calabasas, California
Soccer players from California
UCLA Bruins men's soccer players
Saint Mary's Gaels women's soccer coaches
Stanford Cardinal women's soccer coaches
Living people
20th-century births
Association footballers not categorized by position
Year of birth missing (living people)